The Family Jewels is a 1965 American comedy film. It was filmed from January 18 to April 2, 1965, and was released by Paramount Pictures on July 1, 1965. The film was co-written, directed, and produced by Jerry Lewis who also played seven roles in the film. Lewis' co-star, Donna Butterworth, made only one other film, Paradise, Hawaiian Style, with Elvis Presley. Gary Lewis & The Playboys have a cameo in which they sing "Little Miss Go-Go"; their hit song "This Diamond Ring" is also featured.

Plot
Donna Peyton is a ten-year-old girl who inherits a $30,000,000 fortune from her millionaire industrialist father.  Per terms of his will, Donna must choose one of her six uncles to become her new "father". Willard Woodward, the family chauffeur, takes Donna to all of her uncles to stay with them for two weeks.  Donna's uncles are:

* James Peyton, a ferryboat captain, her father's oldest brother who served in the U.S. Navy during World War II.

* Everett Peyton, a famous circus clown who hates kids and has moved to Switzerland to avoid U. S. taxes.

* Julius Peyton, a professional photographer who photographs female models.

* Captain Edward "Eddie" Peyton, a pilot based in Los Angeles, California who owns his own airline ("Eddie's Airways, the Airline for the Birds") consisting of one plane, a Ford Trimotor.

* Skylock Peyton, a Holmesian detective who loves tea and lived in England until he lost his passport and moved back to the United States. He is accompanied by his faithful companion, Dr. Matson, but Skylock pays more attention to a pool game in Robert Strauss's pool parlour than to Donna.

* Bugsy Peyton, a gangster whom everyone believes was killed by the mob. Only interested in Donna's inheritance, he kidnaps her.  Willard rescues her by tricking the gangsters into believing they are surrounded by armed soldiers.

The more time she spends with her uncles, the more Donna realizes that Willard should be her father: he was always a father to her even when her real father was still alive, because her father was too busy to spend time with her.  Unfortunately the family lawyers will not allow her to choose Willard, insisting that she must choose one of her uncles. At the last minute, Uncle Everett shows up unexpectedly, asking Donna to choose him.  To everyone's surprise, Donna agrees, and the two leave together.  As they walk down the hallway, Donna reveals that she knows the truth: "Uncle Everett" is actually Willard in disguise.  She recognized him because, as always, his shoes were on the wrong feet.

Cast
 Jerry Lewis as Willard Woodward / James Peyton / Everett Peyton / Julius Peyton / Capt. Eddie Peyton / Skylock Peyton / Bugsy Peyton
 Donna Butterworth as Donna Peyton
 Sebastian Cabot as Dr. Matson
 Neil Hamilton as Attorney
 Jay Adler as Mr. Lyman, Attorney

Production
Everett Peyton's clown make-up was devised by Jerry Lewis for 3 Ring Circus.  It was reused by Lewis a second time in Hardly Working.

The character of Julius Peyton is similar to the character of Julius Kelp in Jerry Lewis' earlier film The Nutty Professor (1963).

Home media
The film was released three times on DVD.  Paramount released it on October 12, 2004 and January 5, 2021 and Warner Archive released the film on made-to-order DVD on June 20, 2013.

Reception
On Rotten Tomatoes, the film holds an 80% rating based on 5 reviews, with an average rating of 6.62/10.

Legacy
Several of the film's characters were caricatured in Will the Real Jerry Lewis Please Sit Down, an animated series.

References

External links

1965 films
1965 comedy films
1960s English-language films
Paramount Pictures films
Films directed by Jerry Lewis
Films with screenplays by Jerry Lewis
Films with screenplays by Bill Richmond (writer)
Films produced by Jerry Lewis
American comedy films
1960s American films